The following is a chronologically-ordered list of commercially published recordings by the Mexican musician Vicente Fernández.

Compilations & live albums:

2006 – The Living Legend (track listing for the boxed set edition)

External Links
 

 

Discographies of Mexican artists
Regional Mexican music discographies